The Hollywood Post Alliance Award for Outstanding Editing - Television (30 Minutes and Under) is an annual award, given by the Hollywood Post Alliance, or HPA, to post production workers in the film and television industry, in this case film editors. While television editors have been awarded since 2006, the category first marked a distinction between half-hour series and series longer than that in 2018.

Winners and nominees
 † – indicates a winner of a Primetime Emmy Award for Editing.
 ‡ – indicates a nomination for a Primetime Emmy Award for Editing.

2000s
Outstanding Editing - Television

2010s

Outstanding Editing - Television (30 Minutes and Under)

Programs with multiple awards

3 awards
 Breaking Bad (AMC)

2 awards
 Downton Abbey (PBS)
|}

Programs with multiple nominations

6 nominations
 Breaking Bad (CBS)

5 nominations
 Game of Thrones (HBO)

4 nominations
 Dexter (Showtime)

3 nominations
 Downton Abbey (PBS)
 Glee (Fox)
 House of Cards (Netflix)

2 nominations
 Foo Fighters: Sonic Highways (HBO)
 Russian Doll (Netflix)
 Vice (HBO)

See also

 List of American television awards

References

American television awards